The Original Soul of Michael Jackson is a remix album by American singer Michael Jackson. It features songs recorded early in his career mainly during the 1970s and remixed in 1987, before its release that year by Motown.

Release 
While the album claims that it "contains music never before released", the only new song available was a re-dubbed cover of Edwin Starr's 1970 hit "Twenty-Five Miles", sung by the Jackson Five and solely credited to Michael. The original recording of the song was included on the 2009 set Hello World: The Motown Solo Collection. Some songs were newly edited on the album, with a newly dubbed version of "Dancing Machine". "Ain't No Sunshine" was also slightly different in the vocals and a modern drum machine was added to "Twenty-Five Miles". "Melodie" was planned for a single in an effort to promote the record in the US, but was scrapped for a promo-only single "Twenty-Five Miles"/"Up On The Housetop".

Critical reception 
Reviewing in Christgau's Record Guide: The '80s (1990), Robert Christgau wrote, "Once you get past the slipshod cynicism of Motown's catalogue exploitation, you have to admit that this mostly remixed, sometimes synthed-up mishmash has its charms and even uses—that in fact it's superior to the 'real' 1975 best-of the label long ago deleted. I love the previously unreleased 'Twenty-Five Miles' and the preteen-sings-the-blues 'Doggin' Around,' could live without the two J5 non hits, and will no doubt pull this down when I want to remember 'Dancing Machine' and 'Rockin' Robin.'"

Track listing

References

External links 
 

1987 compilation albums
1987 remix albums
Michael Jackson compilation albums